Captain William Hennah  (January 1768 – 23 December 1832) was British naval officer, whose largely undistinguished career was suddenly highlighted by his assumption of command of HMS Mars at the Battle of Trafalgar in 1805 upon the death of that ship's captain, George Duff, who was decapitated by a cannonball.

Early career 

Hennah was born in January 1768 and baptised on the 7th, the son of Richard Hennah, the vicar of St Austell in Cornwall. In March 1779 Hennah was rated as midshipman. He passed the lieutenant's exam at the beginning of January 1788 but was not promoted until the general round of promotions at the outbreak of the French Revolutionary War in 1793. Hennah had little opportunity for distinction until 1800, when he participated in a boat raid on the Morbihan river in which the French corvette Réloaise was burnt. He reportedly acquitted himself "with great judgement and gallantry", under the command of Lieutenant John Pilfold, another lieutenant who was to command a ship at Trafalgar.

Trafalgar 

Following the Peace of Amiens, Hennah was posted to HMS Mars as first lieutenant under George Duff, and was with the ship during the lead up to the battle of Trafalgar in 1805, when Mars was the first ship to spot the advancing enemy. He was stationed on the quarterdeck during the battle, and following the early death of Captain Duff, Hennah took command of the ship, directing her fire into the Fougueux, despite serious damage to his ship. Mars was so battered by the engagement that she was almost unmanoeuvrable, but continued to fire on any enemy ship which approached, including the French Algésiras and the Spanish Monarca. Following the action and emergency repairs, the Mars returned to Gibraltar with some difficulty, before Hennah was ordered home that winter.

Later life 

Back in London, Hennah received the Thanks of Parliament and a vase from the Patriotic Fund; the naval gold medal was presented to Duff's widow. He was promoted to Captain on 1 January 1806. He also received the very unusual honour of a Letter of Commendation from the ship's company, indicative of the esteem with which he was held even by the common sailors who served under him, who were rarely given over to such overt displays of affection. Hennah did not serve at sea again, settling with his family at Tregony in Cornwall where he lived as a country gentleman and involved himself in local affairs. He was invested as a Companion of the Bath in 1831, on the occasion of King William IV's Coronation Honours. He died peacefully at home in 1832 and was buried nearby at St Cuby Parish Church.

His obituary in The Times of 31 December 1832 read:

Letter to Mrs George Duff 

Letter dated HMS Mars, off Cádiz 27 October 1805
from First Lieutenant William Hennah to Mrs George Duff

Madam,

I believe that a more unpleasant task, than what is now imposed upon me, can scarcely fall to the lot of a person, whose feelings are not more immediately connected by the nearer ties of kindred, but from a sense of duty, (as first Lieutenant of the Mars,) as being myself the husband of a beloved partner, and the father of children; out of the pure respect and esteem to the memory of our late gallant Captain, I should consider myself guilty of a base neglect, should you only be informed of the melancholy circumstances attending the late glorious, though unfortunate victory to many, by a public gazette. The consequences of such an event, while it may occasion the rejoicings of the nation, will in every instance be attended with the deepest regrets of a few.

Alas! Madam, how unfortunate shall I think myself, should this be the first intimation you may have of the irreparable loss you have met with! what apology can I make for entering on a subject so tender and so fraught with sorrow, but to recommend an humble reliance on this great truth, that the ways of Providence, although sometimes inscrutable, are always for the best.

By this, Madam, you are in all probability acquainted with the purport of my letter. Amongst the number of heroes who fell on that ever-memorable 21st inst. in defence of their King and Country; after gloriously discharging his duty to both; our meritorious and much respected Commander, Captain George Duff, is honourably classed; his fate was instantaneous; and he resigned his soul into the hands of the Almighty without a moment's pain.

Poor Norwich is very well. Capatain Blackwood has taken him on board the Euryalas, with the other young gentlemen that came with him, and their schoolmaster.

The whole of the Captain's papers and effects are sealed up, and will be kept in a place of security until proper persons are appointed to examine them. Meanwhile, Madam, I beg leave to assure you of my readiness to give you any information, or render you any service in my power.

And am, Madam, with the greatest respect,
Your most obedient and most humble servant,
WILLIAM HENNAH.

Citations

References

Further reading 
The Trafalgar Captains, Colin White and the 1805 Club, Chatham Publishing, London, 2005,

External links 
 Nelson-society.org
Animation of the Battle of Trafalgar
 William Hennah's descendants

1768 births
1832 deaths
People from St Austell
People from Tregony
Royal Navy officers
Companions of the Order of the Bath
Burials in Cornwall
Royal Navy personnel of the French Revolutionary Wars
Royal Navy personnel of the Napoleonic Wars